Benjamin Barg (born 15 September 1984) is a German footballer who plays for FC 08 Villingen. He is the brother of Thorsten Barg.

He was in the squad of Karlsruher SC in the 2007-08 Bundesliga, but he had no appearance. After this he switched to SV Sandhausen playing in the Regionalliga, at this time the third highest football league in Germany. In the next years, he played regularly for Wuppertaler SV and VfR Aalen in the new formed 3. Liga. Then, he switched gradually to lower class clubs like Borussia M'gladbach II in 2012 and FC 08 Villingen in 2015.

References

External links

 Benjamin Barg Interview

1984 births
Living people
German footballers
SV Sandhausen players
Karlsruher SC II players
Karlsruher SC players
Wuppertaler SV players
VfR Aalen players
Borussia Mönchengladbach II players
2. Bundesliga players
3. Liga players
Sportspeople from Bonn
Association football midfielders
Footballers from North Rhine-Westphalia
Bahlinger SC players